Abenao Elangbam (born 28 September 1986) is an Indian actress working in Manipuri cinema. She has displayed her versatility in acting by taking various roles in Manipuri films. The beginning of her career in films are marked by movies like Cheinakhol, Thoiba Thoibi, Naoshum and Akhunba Mani.

Early life and education
She completed her Master in Adult Education from Manipur University.

Career
Before coming into films, she has acted in some theatrical plays under People's Arts and Dramatic Association, Imphal. Her first film is Chingjaogum Lepliba Thamoi, where she is playing a supporting role. She is most popularly known for her role of Naobi in Thoiba Thoibi. Among her popular films were Thoiba Thoibi, Akhunba Mani, Thokkidagi Kishi, Nobap, Ekhenglaktagi Red Rose, Chumthang Makhong, Bema Bema, Liklaai, Leikang Thambal, Tabunungda Akaiba Likli, Western Sankirtan, Phijigee Mani and Waikhu. In Phijigee Mani, she played an archer.

After her marriage, she continues to act in movies. Some of her films released post-marriage include Korounganba 3 and Ima Machet Icha Tangkhai.

Accolades
For her role in the film Nobap, Elangbam received the Special Jury Award at the 7th Manipur State Film Awards 2010. She was awarded the Best Actress in a Leading Role for her role in the film Pabunggi Cycle at the 2nd SSS MANIFA 2013. Best Actress in a Leading Role award was given to her for portraying the role Thoibi in the film Tabunungda Akaiba Likli at the 3rd SSS MANIFA 2014. She was also honoured with Th. Ashokumar Memorial Award in Arts and Culture at the 10th Foundation Day of USU, Khurai.

Selected filmography

References

External links
 

Indian film actresses
Living people
Manipur University alumni
Meitei people
People from Imphal
Actresses from Manipur
Actresses in Meitei cinema
1986 births
21st-century Indian actresses